Upfield Holdings B.V. is a Dutch food company owning multiple brands of margarine, food spreads, and plant-based foods, including Flora and Blue Band. It states that it is the largest plant-based consumer packaged goods company in the world, operating in 95 countries.

Upfield was spun off from Unilever and purchased by investment firm Kohlberg Kravis Roberts (KKR) in 2018 for US$8.04 billion.

History
Margarine was one of the first products sold by the company that would merge into Unilever. Antoon Jurgens of Oss, Netherlands, acquired the patent for making margarine from its inventor Hippolyte Mège-Mouriès in 1871. Through a series of mergers Jurgens' company became Margarine Unie in 1927 and then Unilever in 1929. Since that time, Unilever has added other margarine and food spread brands.

Although the food spreads division of Unilever maintained a robust profit margin, in the 21st century sales declined as many consumers switched to butter. In the five years leading to 2014, sales of margarine fell 6%, while sales of butter rose 7%.

Following a February 2017 takeover attempt by Kraft Heinz, Unilever chief executive Paul Polman made a pledge to investors to boost returns. In April of the same year, Unilever put the margarine and spreads division up for sale with the intention of returning the net cash from the sale to shareholders.

The sale sparked a bidding war among buyout firms including Apollo Global Management, CVC Capital Partners, Clayton, Dubilier & Rice, and Bain Capital. According to Bloomberg, it was the biggest-leveraged buyout in Europe in 2017. In December 2017, Unilever accepted an offer of €6.8bn from investment firm KKR. The purchase, which was completed in July 2018, was funded by European and North American private equity funds that are under KKR's control. The brands in the sale represented about 7% of Unilever's global business.

In January 2020 they purchased Violife, a brand of plant-based cheese.

Following falling margarine sales as consumers switched to butter, since summer 2020 the company focussed more on the "plant-based" market, also claiming sustainability, to increase sales. The Group also announced it would invest €50 million in a facility for research and development on plant-based products, to be opened at the end of 2021.

Leadership
David Haines, non-executive director of tobacco company Imperial Brands, was appointed CEO in July 2018. Current members of the Executive Committee are listed on the Upfield website.

Products and operations

Upfield's notable brands include:
 Flora, a margarine
 Violife, a vegan product range
 Country Crock, margarines and spreads
 Rama, a margarine and cooking cream brand (Germany)
 Blue Band, margarines, and cheese and vegetable fat spreads
 I Can't Believe It's Not Butter!, a vegetable oil-based spread
 Becel, plant-based margarines
 ProActiv, a Becel sub-brand
 Lätta, a margarine brand in Sweden and Germany
 Bertolli is a brand of Italian food products produced by multiple companies around the world with the trademark owned by Mizkan Holdings; Upfield produces a Bertolli olive oil spread range
 Elmlea, a range of buttermilk and vegetable oil blends sold as cream alternatives
 Fruit d'Or, margarine
 Planta Fin, margarine
 Stork (margarine)
 Delma, a margarine brand
 Minyak Samin Cap Onta (Indonesia only)
 Frytol, solid vegetable oil (Indonesia only)

In southern Africa, Remgro-owned Siqalo Foods, rather than Upfield, holds the rights to several of these brands.

After Upfield was spun off from Unilever in 2018, the Purfleet-on-Thames factory was closed, making 200 employees redundant. Underperformance and excessive costs were determined to be the reason for the closing of the factory.

In June 2020 it was made public that Upfield were to offshore its factory in Helsingborg, Sweden, with 80 employees notified of termination. The manufacture of Upfield's cheese & dairy products was scheduled to move to a factory in Kleve, Germany by February 2021.

Buttermilk was added to now non-vegan UK production of Flora Buttery in 2020.

In March 2021 Upfield announced that the factory in Rotterdam would close in mid-2022.

In November 2021 Upfield bought Unilever's production factory in Cali, Colombia producing Rama, Violife and Blue Band.

References

External links
 

 
Condiment companies
Private equity portfolio companies
Dairy products companies of the Netherlands
2018 mergers and acquisitions
Food and drink companies established in 2018
Food and drink companies of the Netherlands
Manufacturing companies established in 2018
Manufacturing companies based in Amsterdam
Former Unilever companies
Corporate spin-offs
Kohlberg Kravis Roberts companies
Dutch companies established in 2018
Margarine